Troieshchyna, also known as Vyhurivschyna-Troieshchyna or Vygurivschyna-Troieshchyna since 1997, is a large neighbourhood of Kyiv, the capital of Ukraine, the biggest subdivision in Ukraine. Troieshchyna is an outskirt located on the city's northern left-bank and is administratively part of the Desnianskyi District.

Overview
The neighbourhood is a large whole-planned bedroom district housing the population of at least 240,000 residents but also includes a small industrial area. Troieshchyna only became part of Kyiv municipality in 1988; prior to that it was a village of Kyiv Oblast which still exists on the edge of the new neighbourhood.

The area suffers from inadequate transport links to the rest of the city. Kyiv City authorities have at one point decided on extending the Kyiv Metro system to Troieshchyna, either through the proposed Livoberezhna line or the Podilsko-Vyhurivska line which is currently under construction. However, the cost of building a new metro line was too high, and the proposal was scrapped in favour of modernizing an existing light rail system. But in 2018 construction of new bridge for metro continues.

References
Footnotes

Further reading

External links
 
 

Neighborhoods in Kyiv